Echinochloa crus-pavonis is a species of grass known by the common name gulf cockspur grass. It is native to much of the Americas, Africa, and part of Asia, and it is known throughout the world as an introduced species. It is an annual grass often exceeding 1.5 meters in maximum height. The inflorescence is divided into several branches coated in green spikelets.

References

External links
Jepson Manual Treatment
USDA Plants Profile

crus-pavonis
Grasses of North America
Grasses of South America
Grasses of Argentina
Grasses of the United States
Flora of the Caribbean
Flora of Africa
Native grasses of California
Natural history of the Central Valley (California)
Plants described in 1816
Flora without expected TNC conservation status